Yamaguchi Hisashi (born Hisashi Yamaguchi; April 16, 1952 – October 19, 2010) was a sumo wrestler from Nakatsu Ōita, Japan. He made his professional debut in January 1971 and reached the top division in May 1978. Upon his promotion he changed his shikona from his real name to Taniarashi Hisashi. His highest rank was maegashira 4. He retired in November 1982.

His son is Shun Yamaguchi, an active baseball player.

Career record

See also
Glossary of sumo terms
List of sumo tournament second division champions

References

1952 births
Japanese sumo wrestlers
People from Nakatsu, Ōita
Sumo people from Ōita Prefecture
2010 deaths
Sumo wrestlers who use their birth name